Newtown Friends Meetinghouse and Cemetery is a historic Quaker meetinghouse and cemetery in Newtown, Bucks County, Pennsylvania. It was built in 1817, and is a two-story, stuccoed stone building with a gable roof.  It measures 60 feet by 40 feet, 6 bays long and 3 bays deep.  A one-story porch was added in 1866, and the second floor was added in 1900.  Also on the property is a contributing horse shed, built in 1819.  Adjacent to the meeting house is the contributing cemetery.

The site was listed on the National Register of Historic Places in 1977.

Notable interments
 Edward Hicks (1780–1849), Quaker minister and American folk artist
 Michael Hutchinson Jenks (1795–1867), U.S. Congressman

References

External links
 
 
 
 Listing at Philadelphia Architects and Buildings

19th-century Quaker meeting houses
Cemeteries in Bucks County, Pennsylvania
Churches in Bucks County, Pennsylvania
Churches on the National Register of Historic Places in Pennsylvania
Quaker cemeteries
Churches completed in 1817
National Register of Historic Places in Bucks County, Pennsylvania